Luis Beder Herrera (born 26 May 1951) is an Argentine Justicialist Party (PJ) politician. He was the governor of La Rioja Province from 2007 to 2015.

Born in Campanas, La Rioja, Herrera graduated as a lawyer in 1976 from the National University of the Littoral. In 1983 he was re-elected as a provincial deputy for Famatina Department, serving until 1989 with a period as 1st Vice President of the Chamber of Deputies. In 1991 he became coordinating minister of government for the province and in 1995 he was elected Vice Governor as running mate to Ángel Maza.

References

External links

La Rioja Province 

1951 births
Living people
People from La Rioja Province, Argentina
National University of the Littoral alumni
20th-century Argentine lawyers
Governors of La Rioja Province, Argentina
Vice Governors of La Rioja Province
Justicialist Party politicians
Members of the Argentine Chamber of Deputies elected in La Rioja